Harz is a surname. Notable people with the surname include:

Alex Harz, American filmmaker, actor, mountaineer, adventurer, entrepreneur, and philanthropist
Carl Otto Harz (1842–1906), German mycologist, pharmacist, and botanist

See also
Hart (surname)